Andreas Antonakopoulos (born 15 March 1997) is a Greek professional footballer who plays as a striker.

References

1997 births
Living people
Greek footballers
Football League (Greece) players
Super League Greece 2 players
Panachaiki F.C. players
Association football forwards